Turkish presidential elections are held in Turkey as part of the general elections every five years, to determine who will serve as the President of Turkey.

There have been 21 elections for the President of Turkey since the establishment of the republic in 1923, electing 12 distinct Turkish citizens as president. Mustafa Kemal Atatürk and İsmet İnönü were elected four times, Celal Bayar was elected three times, Recep Tayyip Erdoğan was elected twice, Cemal Gürsel, Cevdet Sunay, Fahri Korutürk, Turgut Özal, Süleyman Demirel, Ahmet Necdet Sezer and Abdullah Gül were each elected once. Kenan Evren became the president without an election, so that he assumed the title by the ratification of the present constitution on 7 November 1982 (Constitution of Turkey provisional article 1).

History
Throughout the years, the nature and importance of Turkish presidential elections have changed as a result of constitutional amendments.

Indirect elections (1923-2014)
Initially, the President was elected by MPs in the Turkish parliament

Direct elections since 2014 
The 2014 presidential elections was the first direct election of a President, a result of a 2007 referendum created and backed by the ruling Justice and Development Party (AK party).

Presidential system since 2018 
Following the approval of constitutional changes in a referendum held in 2017, the elected President became both the head of state and head of government. As a result, the parliamentary system of government was replaced with an executive presidency and a presidential system.

Acting presidents
In case of a temporary absence of the president on account of illness, travel abroad, or similar circumstances, the Vice President serves as acting president, and exercises the powers of the president until the president resumes his functions, and if the presidency falls vacant as a result of death or resignation or for any other reason, until the election of a new president.

List of Turkish presidential elections

See also 
 Elections in Turkey
 List of presidents of Turkey

Notes

References

External links
 Roger P. Nye (1977). "Civil-Military Confrontation in Turkey: The 1973 Presidential Election". International Journal of Middle East Studies, 8, pp 209–228. doi:10.1017/S0020743800026957.

Presidents of Turkey
Government of Turkey